Dahomey National Wildlife Refuge is located  southwest of Cleveland, Mississippi, and  east of the settlement of Dahomy. It was established in 1990 when the Nature Conservancy (TNC) purchased  and leased the land back to the United States Fish and Wildlife Service for management. In 1993, the Service completed acquisition of the TNC lands. One additional  tract was purchased by the Mississippi Department of Transportation (MDOT) and turned over to the Service in 1991. The refuge is the largest remaining tract of bottomland hardwood-forested wetlands in the northwest portion of Mississippi.

References
Refuge website

National Wildlife Refuges in Mississippi
Protected areas of Bolivar County, Mississippi
Protected areas established in 1990
1990 establishments in Mississippi
Wetlands of Mississippi
Landforms of Bolivar County, Mississippi